Enniskillen was a constituency represented in the Irish House of Commons until 1800.

History
In the Patriot Parliament of 1689 summoned by James II, Enniskillen was not represented.

Members of Parliament, 1613–1801

1613–1801

Notes

References

 Parliamentary Memoirs of Fermanagh and Tyrone, from 1613 to 1885

Bibliography

Constituencies of the Parliament of Ireland (pre-1801)
Enniskillen
Historic constituencies in County Fermanagh
1613 establishments in Ireland
1800 disestablishments in Ireland
Constituencies established in 1613
Constituencies disestablished in 1800